The 1984 Hofmeister World Doubles was the second staging of the doubles snooker tournament. It was played at the Derngate in Northampton and held between 5 and 16 December 1984 with the tournament televised on ITV.

Defending champions Steve Davis and Tony Meo chances for a third title ended by the teaming of Alex Higgins and Jimmy White in the semi-final by 6–9 and Higgins and White went on to beat Cliff Thorburn and Willie Thorne 10–2 in the final. The highest break of the tournament did not go to the champions but to David Taylor and Mike Hallett with a combined break of 200.

Selected early results
Qualifying Round
Played at Hatton Garden on 2 and 3 November 1984

Last 32

Played at the Derngate, Northampton before the TV coverage began with the last 16 on 8 December.

Main draw

References

World Doubles Championship
World Doubles Championship
World Doubles Championship
World Doubles Championship